Martti Laitinen (9 May 1929 – 7 February 2017) was a Finnish footballer. He played in two matches for the Finland national football team from 1952 to 1953. He was also part of Finland's team for their qualification matches for the 1954 FIFA World Cup.

References

External links
 

1929 births
2017 deaths
Finnish footballers
Finland international footballers
Place of birth missing
Association footballers not categorized by position